William Arbuthnot or Arbuthnott may refer to:

Sir William Arbuthnot, 1st Baronet (1766–1829), Lord Provost of Edinburgh
Sir William Arbuthnot, 3rd Baronet (1831–1889), major in the 18th Hussars
Sir William Arbuthnot Lane, 1st Baronet (1856–1943), surgeon
Sir William Arbuthnot Lane, 2nd Baronet (1897–1972), actor and producer
Sir William Arbuthnot, 2nd Baronet (born 1950)
William Reierson Arbuthnot (1826–1913), British businessman and legislator